Pterolophia semicircularis is a species of beatle in the family Cerambycidae.  It was described by Stephan von Breuning in 1938.

References

semicircularis
Beetles described in 1938